Trees Outside the Academy is the second solo studio album by American musician Thurston Moore of Sonic Youth. It was released on September 18, 2007, and was Moore's follow up of 1995's Psychic Hearts. It was released on Moore's own label, Ecstatic Peace! and recorded with Sonic Youth's drummer Steve Shelley and violinist Samara Lubelski.

The recording took place at Dinosaur Jr guitarist J. Mascis' home studio. Mascis also contributed lead guitar for some tracks. It features the track "Thurston @ 13" which is, "Some weird cassette tape that Thurston found at his mom's of him at 13 years old in the early '70s performing some kind of odd sound-theatre."

The album debuted at #6 on the Billboard Heatseekers chart, barely missing the Billboard 200.

Track listing 

All tracks by Thurston Moore.

 "Frozen Gtr." – 4:07
 "The Shape Is in a Trance" – 4:41
 "Honest James" – 3:52
 "Silver>Blue" – 5:52
 "Fri/End" – 3:33
 "American Coffin" – 3:58
 "Wonderful Witches + Language Meanies" – 2:26
 "Off Work" – 4:14
 "Never Light" – 4:03
 "Free Noise Among Friends" – 0:36
 "Trees Outside the Academy" – 6:07
 "Thurston@13" – 2:38

Personnel 
 Thurston Moore – acoustic & electric guitars, bass, vocals, piano on track 6
 Steve Shelley – drums on tracks 1, 2, 4, 5, 8, 9 & 11
 Samara Lubelski – violin on tracks 1, 2, 4, 5, 8, 9 & 11
 J Mascis – lead guitar on tracks 1, 2, 7 & 11
 Gown – electric guitar on track 1 & 9
 John Moloney – drums on track 7
 Christina Carter – vocals on tracks 1 & 3
Leslie Keffer – noise on track 8

Chart positions

References

External links
Thurston Moore to Drop 'Trees Outside the Academy' Spin
Youth gone solo: Thurston readies Mascis-tastic solo LP  Drowned in Sound

Thurston Moore albums
2007 albums
Ecstatic Peace! albums
Albums produced by John Agnello